Callatis High School is a high school in Mangalia, Romania.

History

Founded in 1959, under the name Mixed Middle School, with grades from the 9th to the 12th.

In 1965, its name was changed into The Theoretical High School with 1-12 grades. Although in 1977, when the communist regime favoured technical education and the school was transformed into The Industrial High School No.2, the theoretical education never stopped in Mangalia as there were classes with this profile functioning in the new high school.

In 1990, there was the opportunity for The Industrial High School No.2 to get back its name and structure but the Teachers’ Council decided to transform it into an economical school due to the touristic potential of the town.

The same year at the proposition of the School General Inspector, Gheorghe Andrei and the Minister of National Education at that time, the Government approved the reopening of the Theoretical High School.

The High school functioned for eight years in a dormitory of the Ion Banescu Industrial High School and in 1998 a new building became the headquarters at 36, Rozelor Street.

At the same time the school changed its name into Callatis Theoretical High School, and the inauguration took place in the presence of PhD. Andrei Marga, Minister of National Education, the General Inspector from Constanta County Inspectorate, Gheorghe Andrei and other personalities of the time. The construction of the school was completed in 2000 (the new wing), and the construction of the gymnasium in 2004.

Until 1998, there were only high school classes, sciences and humanities profiles. Starting with 1999, primary classes were introduced, and starting with 2000 secondary classes, too, two for each grade level.

Events 
Callatis Theoretical High School has had the honour of hosting important events including:
 National Olympiad of Social and Human Sciences – 2005
 The Balkan Conference of Mathematical Sciences - 2007
 The National Mathematics Olympiad – 2009
 The Conference of the National Federation of the Parents’ Association – Pre-university Education - 2009

Schools in Constanța County
Educational institutions established in 1959
High schools in Romania
1959 establishments in Romania